Taylor Lee Sander (born March 17, 1992) is an American professional beach volleyball player and former indoor volleyball player. As a member of the US national team, he won a bronze medal at the 2016 Summer Olympics and the 2018 World Championship. The 2014 World League and the 2015 World Cup winner.

Personal life
Sander is the son of Steven and Kera Sander. He has an older sister and a younger brother, Brenden, who also plays volleyball and is a current member of Brazilian team Sada Volei Cruzeiro. He graduated from Norco High School in Norco, California. At BYU Taylor majored in Global Studies. His parents are LDS, and he grew up LDS (The Church of Jesus Christ of Latter-day Saints – also known by the nickname Mormons). In July 2015, he married Rachel McQuivey, who represented the BYU Track & Field team as a long jumper and hurdler. On June 28, 2018, Taylor and Rachel welcomed their first child.

Career

Beach Volleyball
In the summer of 2022, Sander started his professional beach volleyball career with Taylor Crabb.  The team won the 2022 AVP Phoenix Open - Sept 24 - 25.
Then, two months later, on November 13 2022 Sander and Crabb also won the 2022 AVP Tour Series Huntington Beach Open, having entered the tournament as the #1 seed. They came away with $8,000.00 USD in prize winnings.

College
He was recruited by USC, Long Beach State, UC Irvine, and BYU. At Brigham Young University Sander was a four-time AVCA All-American (three first-team citations, one second-team citation), the 2014 AVCA Player of the Year, 2013 and 2014 MPSF Player of the Year, 2013 and 2014 MPSF Tournament MVP,  and four-time All-MPSF First Team.  He holds the BYU all-time single-match record for service aces (nine) and career service aces (182). In the rally-scoring era, is No. 1 at BYU in career kills (1,743), career attempts (3,464), career service aces (182), season attempts (1,021 in 2014), season service aces (55 in 2014) and aces in a match (nine).

Regarding his decision to attend BYU he said in January 2012, "Growing up in Huntington Beach (Calif.) I've always been a big BYU fan. I grew up LDS and with my parents being LDS, that was the school we always cheered for and I've always wanted to go to BYU since I was a kid."

Clubs
Sander signed a contract with Blu Volley Verona, an Italian Serie A1 team (top level), on June 10, 2014.

National team
Sander competed with Team USA in the 2014 FIVB World League. 4th ranked USA upset 1st ranked Brazil to win the tournament, and Sander was named "best outside spiker" and tournament MVP (which included a $30,000 prize award).

He was on the USA men's roster for the 2014 FIVB World Championships in Poland, August 30 – September 21, 2014 and was selected as USA Volleyball's Men's Team Rookie of the Year.

He was a member of the U.S. team that competed in the 2015 NORCECA Champions Cup in Detroit, Michigan, USA, May 21–23, 2015. Against Mexico May 21, 2015, Sander had 7 points on 6 spikes and 1 block. The U.S. defeated Mexico 25-15, 25-12, 25-17. The following day Team USA defeated Cuba in four sets, 20-25, 25-17, 25-10, 25-14, guaranteeing a top two finish and a spot in the 2015 FIVB World Cup to be held September 8–23, 2015 in Japan. Sander totaled 15 points on 10 spikes, 3 blocks, and 2 aces. In the championship match, May 23, 2015, the U.S. lost to Canada in five sets, 22-25, 25-19, 25-21, 21-25, 15-17. He again totaled 15 points, this time on 12 spikes and 3 aces.

He is on the U.S. Preliminary Roster for the 2015 FIVB World League. He played in the first World League match against Iran, May 30, 2015, in Los Angeles. He led all scorers with 19 points on 16 kills, two blocks and one ace. During the U.S. broadcast of this match on the NBC Sports Network May 31, 2015, Sander appeared to injure his ankle late in the 3rd set after colliding with a teammate on a block attempt and landing awkwardly. Thomas Jaeschke came in soon afterwards and finished out the set, but Sander returned to play all of the 4th set.

He did not play in the second match against Iran and was not on the roster for the next two matches against Russia. He also was not on the roster for the matches against Poland June 12 and 13, 2015, in Hoffman Estates, Illinois, due to an ankle injury, but did travel and practice with the team. Coach John Speraw mentioned during the press conference following the 2nd match against Poland that he was not sure when Sander would be ready to play again.

He traveled with the team to Iran and was back on the roster for the June 19 and 21 matches played/to be played in Tehran, Iran at the Azadi Stadium. He played the entire 3rd set of the 0-3 (19-25, 27-29, 20-25) loss to Iran June 19, 2015. He scored 5 points on 5 kills from 9 attempts. He also had 1 dig and 4 excellent receptions out of 5 attempts.

Honours

Clubs
 CEV Champions League
  2017/2018 – with Cucine Lube Civitanova

 FIVB Club World Championship
  Poland 2017 – with Cucine Lube Civitanova

 CSV South American Club Championship
  Belo Horizonte 2019 – with Sada Cruzeiro

 CEV Challenge Cup
  2015/2016 – with Calzedonia Verona

 National championships
 2016/2017  Qatari Cup, with Al Arabi Doha
 2018/2019  Brazilian Cup, with Sada Cruzeiro

Youth national team
 2008  NORCECA U19 Championship
 2010  NORCECA U21 Championship

Individual awards
 2012: Pan American Cup – Most Valuable Player
 2013: NCAA national championship – All–Tournament Team 
 2013: Pan American Cup – Best Server
 2014: NCAA national championship – All–Tournament Team 
 2014: FIVB World League – Most Valuable Player
 2014: FIVB World League – Best Outside Hitter
 2016: CEV Challenge Cup – Most Valuable Player
 2018: FIVB Nations League – Best Outside Hitter
 2019: CSV South American Club Championship – Most Valuable Player

References

External links

 Player profile at TeamUSA.org 
 
 Player profile at LegaVolley.it 
 Player profile at PlusLiga.pl 
 
 
 Player profile at Volleybox.net
 BYU – Taylor Sander Profile

1992 births
Living people
Sportspeople from Huntington Beach, California
American men's beach volleyball players
American men's volleyball players
Olympic bronze medalists for the United States in volleyball
Volleyball players at the 2016 Summer Olympics
Volleyball players at the 2020 Summer Olympics
Medalists at the 2016 Summer Olympics
American expatriate sportspeople in Italy
Expatriate volleyball players in Italy
American expatriate sportspeople in China
Expatriate volleyball players in China
American expatriate sportspeople in Qatar
Expatriate volleyball players in Qatar
American expatriate sportspeople in Brazil
Expatriate volleyball players in Brazil
American expatriate sportspeople in Poland
Expatriate volleyball players in Poland
BYU Cougars men's volleyball players
Blu Volley Verona players
Skra Bełchatów players
Outside hitters